Matthew Sturgis (born 1960) is a British historian and biographer.

Early life
Sturgis earned a degree in history at the University of Oxford.

Career
Sturgis has written art criticism for Harpers & Queens, travel journalism for The Sunday Telegraph, book reviews for The Independent, and cartoons for the Oldie and the Daily Mail.

The Independent called his 1998 Aubrey Beardsley: A Biography "impressively researched".

Reviewing Walter Sickert: A Life, Sickert scholar Richard Shone concluded, "At last Sickert has the biography he deserves". Another reviewer found Sturgis "marvelous in capturing the sparkling eccentricities of his subject along with the changing fads and fashions to which Sickert was throughout his long life so sensitive".

Reviewing Oscar: A Life in The Guardian, Anthony Quinn wrote "he is a tremendous orchestrator of material, fastidious, unhurried, indefatigable." The Evening Standard, called it "sympathetic and insightful", and "much better" than the last major biography of Wilde, by Richard Ellman thirty years earlier.

Personal life
He is married to the art dealer and gallerist Rebecca Hossack, and they live in a Georgian house in Fitzrovia, London.

Publications
1992 and All This, Macmillan, 1991
Passionate Attitudes: The English Decadence of the 1890s, Macmillan, 1995
Aubrey Beardsley: A Biography, 1998
1900 House: Featuring Extracts from the Personal Diaries of Joyce and Paul Bowler and Their Family with Mark McCrum, Macmillan, London, 1999. 
Walter Sickert: A Life, 2005
Oscar: A Life, Head of Zeus, 2018. Published in the U.S. as Oscar Wilde: A Life, Alfred A. Knopf, 2021.

References

Living people
Alumni of the University of Oxford
20th-century British historians
21st-century British historians
British biographers
Place of birth missing (living people)
1960 births